Kabalaba is a live album by the Art Ensemble of Chicago recorded at the Montreux Jazz Festival in 1974 and released on their AECO label in 1978. It features performances by Lester Bowie, Joseph Jarman, Roscoe Mitchell, Malachi Favors Maghostut, and Don Moye along with Muhal Richard Abrams.

Reception
The Allmusic review by Brian Olewnick states "This recording contains several fine episodes, but the interested listener would do better to hear [Fanfare for the Warriors] for a full picture of this particular Art Ensemble incarnation's great powers".

Track listing 
 "Kabalaba-Bees" (Art Ensemble of Chicago) - 3:10
 "Interlude" (Art Ensemble of Chicago) - 2:00
 "Kaba Song" (Don Moye) - 4:32
 "Interlude" (Art Ensemble of Chicago) - 1:15
 "Theme for Sco/Kabalaba" (Joseph Jarman) - 14:48
 "Duo" (Muhal Richard Abrams) - 2:10
 "Sun Precondition One" (Moye) - 5:30
 "Interlude" (Art Ensemble of Chicago) - 1:48
 "Improvization A2" (Roscoe Mitchell) - 6:00
 "Mal's Delight" (Lester Bowie) - 3:50
 "Kabalaba Speaks" (Art Ensemble of Chicago) - 4:57

Personnel 
Lester Bowie: trumpet, percussion instruments
Malachi Favors Maghostut: bass, percussion instruments, vocals
Joseph Jarman: saxophones, clarinets, percussion instruments
Roscoe Mitchell: saxophones, clarinets, flute, percussion instruments
Don Moye: drums, percussion
Muhal Richard Abrams: piano

References 

Art Ensemble of Chicago live albums
1978 live albums
AECO Records live albums